Francesco Carrara may refer to:

 Francesco I da Carrara (1325–1393)
 Francesco Carrara (Cardinal), Camerlengo of the Sacred College of Cardinals 1790–1791
 Francesco Carrara (jurist) (1805–1888), Italian jurist 
 Francesco Carrara (archaeologist) (1812–1854), Italian archaeologist